David Posnack Jewish Day School (formerly David Posnack Hebrew Day School) is a private Jewish day school located in Davie, Florida.

History
The school was founded in 1974 as an elementary school located in Plantation, Florida. The middle school was added in 1983 and the high school in 1998. In January 2011, the David Posnack Jewish Day School consolidated its lower, middle, and high schools onto one campus in Davie, Florida. Previously, only the lower school was located on the campus, with the middle and high schools located in Plantation, Florida.

For the 2011-2012 school year, the school was renamed from David Posnack Hebrew Day School to David Posnack Jewish Day School (Posnack School, Posnack Jewish Day School).

Technology

Lower School
The Lower School introduced iPads for grades K-4 and Fujitsu Stylistic Q702 Slate PCs for grade 5 at the start of the 2011 school year. All of the iPads are stored in mobile PC storage units, referred to as C.O.W.s. (Computers on Wheels) 5th Grade students get to use the Slates in school.

Upper School
The Upper School initiated a Tablet PC program, using the Toshiba Portege M750 Series Tablets beginning in 2009.

For the start of the 2010-2011 school year, new students purchased the Toshiba Portege M780 Series Tablets and for the 2011-2012 school year, new students purchased either the Fujitsu Lifebook T731 or the Fujitsu Lifebook T580. Software used includes DyKnow, and Microsoft Office (including Microsoft OneNote). The school supports Windows XP, Windows 7, and Windows 8 for the Tablets.

Posnack Virtual School 
In 2017, Posnack School launched Posnack Virtual School a real-time online Jewish high school program, offering a full dual-curriculum education to Jewish homeschooling students and students living in areas without a local Jewish high school. Students access live general and Jewish studies classes through a learning management system. Students also have full access to the school's college counseling services. Students who complete the program earn a Posnack High School diploma.

Administration

Curriculum
Fischer High School curriculum includes Science, Mathematics, Tanakh, English, Hebrew, Physical Education, Health, World History, and Rabbinics. The School has an outstanding Advanced Placement program in History, Economics, Government, Psychology, Human Geography, Physics, Chemistry, Biology, Calculus, Statistics, English, Music and Art. Middle School curriculum includes Science, Torah, Mathematics (Including up to two-year ahead Advanced Courses), Hebrew, English, Physical Education, World History, United States History, Jewish Denominations, Jewish History, Israel History and Holocaust Studies.

Extracurricular activities
Student activities at Posnack School include:
American Israel Public Affairs Committee
Art for the Heart
Business Club
Chess Club
Creative Writing Club
Computer Science Club
Drama
Drumline
English Honors Society
Film Production Club
Health, Science, and Medical Club
Jewish Student Union
Jewish Identity Club
Marching Band
Moot Beit Din
Model UN Club
Mu Alpha Theta
National Arts Honor Society
National Honor Society
National Junior Honor Society
No Place for Hate
Pep Club
Programming Club
Student Government
Students Against Destructive Decisions
Technology Internship
Tefillah
Thespians
Yearbook

Athletics
Posnack School has had successful tennis and swimming teams, and has won four all-sports championships since 2005. They were winter soccer state runner up in 2005-2006, beating University school in David Posnack Jewish Day School's first district finals win. First-Ever State Championship playoff berth led by midfielder, Solomon Braun (went to play for Princeton), Abraham Braun,  Eitan Siso, Forward Barak Lynn, Oshri Amar, Josif Rotlowitz, Sharon Keidan, Danny marks, Jeremey Klawsky, and goalie Alex Fried (most winning goalie in the school's history record for most shutouts ever recorded.) Former head coach, Mitch Evron held the records for wins at Posnack School. He formerly coached Andy Roddick.   Through the 2010-2011 season, the basketball team played in Florida's Class 1A private school division. Since the 2011-2012 season, Posnack competes in the new 2A Urban classification.  The Posnack School athletic program received national attention in 2011 when former-NBA player Kenny Anderson was named coach of the High School Boys' Varsity Basketball team. Anderson's signing with Posnack echoed Joe Bryant pursuing his first coaching position at Akiba Hebrew Academy in Lower Merion, Pennsylvania in 1992-1993.

Notable alumni
Gabe Dunn, writer and blogger

References

External links

Ram News 

Educational institutions established in 1974
Jewish day schools in Florida
Jews and Judaism in Broward County, Florida
Private high schools in Broward County, Florida
Private schools in Broward County, Florida
Private middle schools in Florida
Private elementary schools in Florida
Private K-12 schools in Florida
Davie, Florida
1974 establishments in Florida